The Sassoun Massacre refers to several mass murders that occurred during the Hamidian Massacres of the 1890s and the Armenian genocide in 1915. It took place in the Sassoun region of the Ottoman Empire, which is now part of Eastern Turkey.

History
In 1894, the sultan began to target the Armenian people in a precursor to the Hamidian massacres. This persecution strengthened nationalistic sentiment among Armenians. The first notable battle in the Armenian resistance took place in Sasun. Hunchak activists, such as Mihran Damadian, Hampartsoum Boyadjian, and Hrayr Dzhoghk, encouraged resistance against double taxation and Ottoman persecution. The ARF armed the people of the region. The Armenians confronted the Ottoman army and Kurdish irregulars at Sasun, finally succumbing to superior numbers and to Turkish assurances of amnesty, which never materialized.

In response to the resistance at Sasun, the governor of Mush responded by inciting the local Muslims against the Armenians. Historian Lord Kinross wrote that massacres of this kind were often achieved by gathering Muslims in a local mosque and claiming the Armenians had the aim of "striking at Islam".

This statement was made by Edward Atkin of the Armenian Relief Fund on August 31, 1895: 

Sultan Abdul Hamid sent the Ottoman army into the area and also armed groups of Kurdish irregulars. The violence spread and affected most of the Armenian towns in the Ottoman Empire.

Upon investigation, a European mission concluded that Armenians were not at fault, but rather acted in self-defense. The mission called for the sultan to enforce the reforms that were previously pledged.

Some Ottoman officials went against orders to massacre and terrorize. Ibrahim of Akhlat reported violence to the British, while Celaleddin Bey of Muş wrote a report criticizing the use of armed forces against Armenians and stating that 10,000 people had been killed. Celaleddin was later transferred and removed from office. Ferik Edhem Paşa also refused to carry out palace orders.

British Vice Consul Shipley's report wrote "the Armenians were massacred without distinction of age or sex were absolutely hunted like wild beasts, being killed wherever they were met, an it was not so much the suppression of a pseudo revolt which was desired by Turkish authorities as the extermination pure and simple of the Armenians in Sassoon".

The Ottoman Empire was in decline, and the ruling Young Turks saw the Armenian population as a threat to their vision of a unified Turkish state. In 1915, the Ottoman government began a systematic campaign to eliminate the Armenian population. This campaign was characterized by mass deportations, forced marches, and massacres.

The Sassoun Massacre was one of the most significant events of this campaign. The Ottoman government sent a large military force to the region, which began to systematically attack Armenian villages and towns.

Women have been stolen, their breasts cut off, their stomachs ripped, children impaled, old men dismembered. Young girls withdrew in uncountable set ... since May 5th, Turkish armies have wiped out one village after another in Berdakh, Mkragom, Alikrpo, Avazakhiubr and Arnist.

Armenian genocide
By the summer of 1915, the Ottoman government had mobilized approximately 30,000 soldiers in the Sassoun region to carry out the forced expulsion and massacre of the remaining Armenian population. The army and Kurdish irregulars launched their first major attack in mid-July on Sassoun Central, Shatakh, Talvorik, Khiank, and surrounding areas. Although the defenders managed to hold them off until early August, they eventually ran out of ammunition and suffered heavy casualties, leading them to attempt to break out of the encirclement.

The assault and pursuit by the army and Kurdish mobs resulted in the deaths of over 4,000 civilians. Only a few thousand managed to escape the Ottoman lines and reach the Russian positions at Manazkert in March 1916. Some of those who survived the attack were deported or taken into Kurdish families as war booty.

Sassouni's records indicate that approximately 2,400 Armenians were relocated from regions affected by the previous year's conflict as of June 1916. The advances of the Russian Empire into Moush and other neighboring provinces in 1915 and 1916 resulted in the displacement of approximately 11,000 Armenians from Khout-Brnashen and Motkan. The group of evacuees included an estimated 400 to 500 individuals from Moush town, nearby villages on the Plain of Moush, and the adjacent vilayet of Diyarbekir.

According to Petoyan's account, roughly 10,000 civilians sought refuge in the dense thickets and caves surrounding Gelieguzan and Mount Andok until the arrival of the Russian army in Manazkert. Meanwhile, Sassouni estimated that a total of 13,000 Armenians were able to escape from Sassoun, excluding 400 individuals who were not from the county. These numbers are consistent with a more recent estimate, which suggests that only around 15,000 Sassoun residents survived the ordeal and resettled in Russian Armenia.

Most of the Armenian residents of Sassoun had disappeared by August of 1915, leaving the region mostly devoid of its indigenous population, and numerous Armenian villages had been destroyed.In the winter months of 1915-1916, the remaining groups of Armenians who resisted were eradicated despite starvation and harsh winter weather. Despite the tragic events that took place, the region still represents one of the few locations in Turkey where fragmented communities of Armenian survivors persist, with some retaining their cultural identity through speaking Armenian and practicing the Christian faith among the older generations.

International reaction
After the outbreak of violence, the authorities in the area, as well as the Ottoman State, made efforts to hide the events that had taken place. However, the ambassadors of France, Great Britain, and Russia demonstrated a rare unity by demanding an investigation into the Sasun violence and punishment for the local bureaucratic instigators.  In the winter of 1894-1895, Sultan Abdülhamid dispatched a team of investigators to Muş. The Sultan personally selected the members of the commission, which included three officials from France, Great Britain, and Russia, who were appointed due to their trusted status. The European delegates unequivocally concluded that Ottomans had committed massacres of the Armenian people of the Sasun mountain region.

References

Further reading

See also
Hamidian massacres
Anti-Armenian sentiment
Armenian Genocide
1894 Sasun rebellion

External links
Sasun 1894: Mountains, Missionaries and Massacres at the End of the Ottoman Empire by Owen Miller

Massacres of Christians
Persecution of Christians in the Ottoman Empire
Persecution of Oriental Orthodox Christians
Massacres in 1896
Anti-Armenian pogroms
Massacres in Armenia
Massacres of Armenians